As a reaction firstly on COVID-19 pandemic in 2020 and next on invasion on Ukraine, prices on residential real estate in Russia increased rapidly: comparing the last quarter of 2019 with the 2-th quarter of 2022 the average increase in the entire economy amounted to 56.57% while the inflation for the same period amounted to 27.17% which means increasing in 23.15% above inflation during 1.5 years.

References